is a Japanese professional shogi player ranked 7-dan. He is a former director of the Japan Shogi Association.

Early life
Kitajima was born in Tokyo on January 1, 1966. He entered the Japan Shogi Association's apprentice school in November 1980 at the rank 6-kyū as a student of shogi professional . He was promoted to the rank of 1-dan in 1983 and obtained full professional status and the rank of 4-dan in April 1995.

Shogi professional

Promotion history
Kitajima's promotion history is as follows:
 6-kyū: 1980
 1-dan: 1983
 4-dan: April 1, 1995
 5-dan: June 3, 1999
 6-dan: October 1, 2003
 7-dan: August 14, 2014

JSA director
Tadajima is a former member of the Japan Shogi Association's board of directors, having served as a director from 2002 to 2004 and then again from 2011 to 2013.

References

External links
ShogiHub: Professional Player Info · Kitajima, Tadao

Japanese shogi players
Living people
Professional shogi players
Professional shogi players from Tokyo Metropolis
1966 births